Weston-under-Redcastle is a civil parish in Shropshire, England.  It contains 24 listed buildings that are recorded in the National Heritage List for England.  Of these, one is listed at Grade I, the highest of the three grades, two are at Grade II*, the middle grade, and the others are at Grade II, the lowest grade.  The parish includes the village of Weston-under-Redcastle and the surrounding area.  The area contains Hawkstone Park within which are a number of listed buildings.  Many of the listed buildings elsewhere are houses, cottages and farmhouses, the earliest of which are timber framed.  The other listed buildings include a ruined castle, a church, village stocks and a pump, and a former dower house and associated structures


Key

Buildings

References

Citations

Sources

Lists of buildings and structures in Shropshire